Yutha Satham is a 2022 Indian Tamil-language action thriller film directed by Ezhil and produced by Kallal Global Entertainment. The film stars R. Parthiban, Gautham Karthik and Saipriya Deva, with a supporting cast including Robo Shankar, Manobala, Vaiyapuri and Chaams. It is based on the novel of the same name by Rajesh Kumar. The film's music and score is composed by D. Imman, with cinematography handled by R. B. Gurudev and editing done by Gopi Krishna. The film was released on 18 March 2022 to negative reviews.

Plot 
Kathirvelan (R. Parthiban) plays a cop, who has returned to the force after a break following a personal tragedy. Kathirvelan gets a sensational case, literally right on his station's doorstep. After all, the victim, Raghavi (Saipriya Deva), has been stabbed multiple times by unidentified men. Kathirvelan, for some reason, decides to go after Nagulan (Gautham Karthik), Raghavi's boyfriend and a private detective. But Nakulan claims innocence and swears to find the killer himself.

Cast

Production 
In November 2020, R. Parthiban and Gautham Karthik were cast to play the lead roles in the film directed by Ezhil. The film is adapted from the crime novel of the same name written by Rajesh Kumar.

Music 

D. Imman composed the soundtrack and background score of the film while collaborating with Gautham Karthik for the second time after Yennamo Yedho and Ezhil for the fifth time after Manam Kothi Paravai, Desingu Raja, Vellaikaara Durai and Saravanan Irukka Bayamaen.The audio rights were sold to Aditya Music.The first single track "Thailaanguyil" was released on 11 March 2022.Another single track "Rock N Roll Rasaathi" was sung by Benny Dayal and Joewin Shamalina and released on 16 March 2022.The full album jukebox was released on 19 March 2022 after the film's release.The original soundtrack score was released on 8 April 2022.

Background Score

Release 
The film was scheduled to be released in theatres on 26 January 2022, but got postponed to 18 March 2022.

Reception
M. Suganth of The Times of India who gave 1.5 out of 5 stars after reviewing the film stated that "By the time we get to the final revelation on the identity of the killer, we hardly care." Avinash Ramachandran of Cinema Express gave 1.5 out of 5 stars stating that But the biggest mystery is how a film like this lacking in entertainment was made by Ezhil. It makes one ask... Whodunit, actually!." Maalai Malar Critic noted that " Director Eghil has made the film less interesting with a thriller storyline. Fans have been disappointed as he has directed this film away from his previous films. The film lacks the sizzle and dynamism that a thriller film should have."

References

External links 
 

Films based on Indian novels
Films scored by D. Imman
Indian action thriller films
2022 action thriller films